KAFY (1100 AM) is a radio station broadcasting a Spanish-language Christian format. Licensed to Bakersfield, California, United States, the station is currently owned by Socorro Torres' Torres Media Group, LLC, through licensee AOTS Holdings, Inc.

History
KAFY signed on in 1946. In the 1960s & 1970s, KAFY was the top-rated rock station in the Bakersfield area, as well as the largest per capita in the country. At that time it was located at 550 AM. KAFY was among the several stations in California using the "Boss Radio" format, similar to KHJ in Los Angeles, KFRC in San Francisco, KGB in San Diego and KYNO in Fresno.  In a business deal with Buck Owens, the owner of KUZZ (a country station), the station switched frequencies. On November 9, 2000, the station on 1100 kHz was granted the KAFY call letters.

References

External links

Radio stations established in 2000
AFY
AFY
AFY
2000 establishments in California